Lynn Montross was born in Battle Creek, Nebraska in 1895, and lived in Denver, Colorado, before moving to Washington, D.C. He studied at the University of Nebraska before serving three years in an American Expeditionary Force (AEF) regiment in World War I, and afterward became a free-lance writer for the Chicago Daily News. He died in 1961, barely a year after the publication of the third edition his most important book, War Through the Ages.

Lynn Montress is one of the foremost post-World War II Western military historians. From 1950 to 1961 he was a historical writer for the United States Marine Corps and lived in the Washington, D.C. area. Though he only published seven books during his life, his insightful monumental lifetime work, War Through the Ages (1960), stands as one of the important works of military history in the 20th century. It has been used as a text book by various military academies.

Montross' footnotes show the influence of  Edward Gibbon's famous work, The Decline and Fall of the Roman Empire (1787). Montross translates the style and grandeur of Gibbon's work to a narrative and analysis of military history from 490 B.C. to the Korean War. Lynn Montross' version of military history is more about diplomacy, politics, culture, and economics, and the continuity and great movements of history than about specific battles, the names of generals, and mundane operational details, though he also fits lot of those into his narrative, imparting upon the reader his unusual sense of military history in the process.

Montross influenced  Trevor N. Dupuy and R. Ernest Dupuy's work, Encyclopedia of Military History. Not only does the Encyclopedia of Military History use the same illustrations as those found in War through the ages, but also, interspersed with the chronologies of battles and generals, the Encyclopedia has Montross-like narrative sections describing specific periods of history, or particular battles.

References

External links
 
 "America's Most Imitated Battle." by Lynn Montross. American Heritage, Vol. 7, No. 3 (April 1956), pp. 35–37, 100–101.
 Articles available at Harpers Magazine (fee)
 List of works by Lynn Montross
 Lynn Montross Papers at Syracuse University
 

1895 births
1961 deaths
20th-century American historians
20th-century American male writers
American male non-fiction writers